Seigneur  (English: Lord), was the name formerly given in France to someone who had been granted a seigneurie (fief) by the crown, with all its associated rights over person and property.

Seigneur may also refer to:
 The seigneurial system of New France
 The hereditary feudal ruler of the island of Sark (see list of seigneurs of Sark)
 Eddy Seigneur (born 1969), French road racing cyclist
 Rivière du Seigneur, a tributary of St. Lawrence River in Les Éboulements, Charlevoix Regional County Municipality, Capitale-Nationale, Quebec, Canada